Alexander Grill (1938–2009) was an Austrian film actor.

Selected filmography
 When You're With Me (1970)
 When the Mad Aunts Arrive (1970)
 Aunt Trude from Buxtehude (1971)
 The Reverend Turns a Blind Eye (1971)
 Cry of the Black Wolves (1972)
 Love Bavarian Style (1973)
 Blue Blooms the Gentian (1973)
 Crazy - Completely Mad (1973)
 Spring in Immenhof (1974)
 No Sin on the Alpine Pastures (1974)
 Schwarzwaldfahrt aus Liebeskummer (1974)
 Three Swedes in Upper Bavaria (1977)
 Popcorn and Ice Cream (1978)

References

External links
 

1938 births
2009 deaths
Austrian male film actors
Military personnel from Graz